The Joaquim Portugal Stadium, also known as Arena Unimed for naming rights, is a Brazilian football stadium built in São João del-Rei (state of Minas Gerais) in the Matosinhos neighborhood.

Field command 
The stadium is where Athletic Club plays its games for the Campeonato Mineiro de Futebol.

Important matches

2023

Campeonato Mineiro - Módulo I 
The stadium was the venue for the first match of the semifinal of 2023 Campeonato Mineiro - Módulo I between Athletic Club and Atlético Mineiro, on March 12, Sunday. Athletic defeated Atlético 1x0.

Copa do Brasil 
The stadium hosted the 2023 Copa do Brasil match Athletic Club vs. Brasiliense on March 1, 2023. Brasiliense eliminated Athletic from the competition.

Campeonato Brasileiro - Série D 
The stadium will be one of the venues for the 2023 Campeonato Brasileiro - Série D, the fourth tier of the national championship.

Capacity 
The stadium has a capacity of 2,500 people and is one of the largest stadiums in the Intermediate Geographic Region of Barbacena. The capacity released by the Football Association of Minas Gerais is 2,303 people.

References 

Football in Brazil
Football venues in Minas Gerais